Velykyi Liubin is an urban-type settlement located in Lviv Raion (district) of Lviv Oblast (region) in western Ukraine. The settlement has a balneological and cardiological resort and sanatorium. It hosts the administration of Velykyi Liubin settlement hromada, one of the hromadas of Ukraine.
Local government is administered by Velykoliubinska town council. Population:

Geography 
The settlement Velykyi Liubin is located along the Highway Ukraine – Lviv – Sambir – Uzhhorod.

History 
Today this is an urban-type settlement. Area of the settlement totals is 33.45 km2 and the population is about 4550 people. 

Until 18 July 2020, Velykyi Liubin belonged to Horodok Raion. The raion was abolished in July 2020 as part of the administrative reform of Ukraine, which reduced the number of raions of Lviv Oblast to seven. The area of Horodok Raion was merged into Lviv Raion.

Religious structures and attractions 
In the settlement there are three religious communities. This religious community of the Ukrainian Greek Catholic Church, Religious Community of the Ukrainian Orthodox Church of the Kyivan Patriarchate and Religious Community of the Roman Catholic Church.
At today in the settlement is the wooden Greek Catholic Church, St. Nicholas Greek Orthodox Church (2000), Church of St. Nicholas the Wonderworker and Roman Catholic Church of Our Lady of Częstochowa (1930–1932).

References

External links 
 З історії Любеня Великого 
  weather.in.ua/ Velykyi Liubin'

Literature 
 Історія міст і сіл УРСР : Львівська область, Городоцький район, Великий Любінь. – К. : ГРУРЕ, 1968 р. Page 227 

Villages in Lviv Raion